Christian name meaning "God's Love" or "Love of God". Its origin is from a combination of Hebrew and Greek words. The segment "Jo" stands for  יהוה in Hebrew (YHWH in Latin script) represent God while "phil" stands for φιλία (love or affection) in Greek. Other forms of the name with same meaning includes Theophilose, Theophilus, Jophilus, etc

Given names